Moon Hee-sang (Korean: 문희상; Hanja: 文喜相; born 3 March 1945) is a South Korean politician. He has a bachelor's degree in law from Seoul National University. He is a member of the National Assembly, and was the interim leader of the New Politics Alliance for Democracy from 2014 to 2015.

On 13 July 2018, he was elected as the new Speaker of the National Assembly.

References

External links
Official website 

Members of the National Assembly (South Korea)
Speakers of the National Assembly (South Korea)
Minjoo Party of Korea politicians
Seoul National University School of Law alumni
Kyungbock High School alumni
People from Uijeongbu
1945 births
Living people
Chiefs of Staff to the President of South Korea
Deputy Speakers of the National Assembly (South Korea)